Ajay Kumar Kakkar, Baron Kakkar,  (born 28 April 1964) is professor of surgery at University College London.

Early life and education
Ajay Kakkar was born in 1964 in Dartford, to professor of vascular surgery Vijay Kakkar and his wife, a consultant anaesthetist.

He was educated at Alleyn's School before gaining admission to King's College London, where he gained at first a bachelor's degree in pharmacology in 1985 and then a medical degree in 1988. Subsequently, he was awarded a Doctor of Philosophy (PhD) degree by Imperial College London: his doctoral thesis was submitted in 1998 and was titled "Tissue factor, thrombin generation and cancer".

Son of Professor of vascular surgery Vijay Kakkar, pioneer in the use of low-molecular weight heparin therapy, he followed in his footsteps as a surgeon and medical researcher.

Career
Kakkar is Chair of King's Health Partners, the Academic Health Science Centre, Director of the Thrombosis Research Institute, London, and lectures and publishes widely on his specialism. He has worked with the NHS on its strategy to prevent venous thromboembolism (VTE).

He is a Commissioner of the Royal Hospital Chelsea, chair of the Board of Governors at Alleyn's School, Dulwich, and a Trustee of the Dulwich Estate.

Kakkar was created a life peer on 22 March 2010 as Baron Kakkar, of Loxbeare in the County of Devon, and introduced in the House of Lords the same day. He sits on the crossbenches.

He was Chairman of the House of Lords Appointments Commission from 2013 to 2018.

Kakkar has been noted for his work promoting British business as an ambassador for the United Kingdom. He has taken 11 trips in 2014 to promote business relations.

He was appointed Knight Commander of the Order of the British Empire (KBE) in the 2022 New Year Honours for services to healthcare and for public service.

Arms

References

1964 births
Living people
People educated at Alleyn's School
Alumni of King's College London
Fellows of King's College London
Alumni of Imperial College London
Crossbench life peers
People's peers
English surgeons
British politicians of Indian descent
Members of the Privy Council of the United Kingdom
English people of Punjabi descent
Knights Commander of the Order of the British Empire
People from Dartford
Academics of University College London
Life peers created by Elizabeth II